Gijs Weterings (born 24 July 1965) is a Dutch field hockey player. He competed in the men's tournament at the 1992 Summer Olympics.

References

External links
 

1965 births
Living people
Dutch male field hockey players
Olympic field hockey players of the Netherlands
Field hockey players at the 1992 Summer Olympics
People from Zulia